Red Cliff, also known as Gaa-Miskwaabikaang, is a Tribal Nation in the town of Russell, Bayfield County, Wisconsin, United States. Red Cliff is the administrative center of the Red Cliff Band of Lake Superior Chippewa. The reservation population is 1353, primarily Native American.

The Red Cliff Reservation

The Red Cliff Reservation was created through a series of treaties between the U.S. Government and the Red Cliff Band of Lake Superior Chippewa Indians (Red Cliff Band), the most recent being the treaty of 1854.

Transportation
Wisconsin Highway 13 serves as a main route in the community.

Bus service is provided by Miskwaabekong Transit in partnership with Bay Area Rural Transit.

Images

References

Unincorporated communities in Wisconsin
Unincorporated communities in Bayfield County, Wisconsin